Nakkheeran Gopal (born 10 April 1959) is a veteran journalist from Tamil Nadu, India. He is the editor and publisher of Tamil political investigative journal Nakkheeran. He shot to national fame in the 1990s when he took interviews with Veerappan, who was surviving in the forests committing crimes on the Tamil Nadu – Karnataka border, hoodwinking the police of the two states.

Early life
He completed his school education at Municipal School of Aruppukkottai and SBK Higher Secondary School. After clearing pre-university course at Devanga Arts College, he graduated as Bachelor of Commerce from Saiva Bhanu Kshatriya College in 1977. Apart from academics, he was part of his college hockey team and also involved in art works that could be considered as one of the early signs of a contemporary layout artist and editor.

Post-degree, Rajagopal's father wanted him to be employed in a bank. Rather being idle waiting for a bank profession, Gopal worked in a provisional store much to his father’s displeasure. In 1978, his relative promised him of a job in then Madras however that could not be fulfilled later but eyeing, which Rajagopal had moved into capital city initially.

In 1983, Rajagopal and his friend jointly started a rubber firm investing around 3000 rupees. Things were not proceeding well from the beginning. Thought exhausted they could manage with just one meal daily. At times, they might even need to cycle all around the city. He turned ill and had returned to his native. He abstained from work for four months during recovery but improved his artistic skills meantime. His friends and neighbours suggested him to seek a relevant job that would display his splendid artworks.

In 1985, Rajagopal was rightly identified by Valampuri John, the editor of Thai magazine run by the then Chief Minister M. G. Ramachandran. He gained much knowledge on layout work supported by the encouraging editor. He also got exposed to production work during his venture in Thiraichuvai. However, Rajagopal had learnt the success story when he acted as a layout director in Tharasu magazine. The readers loved the wrapper layout work that sensibly portrayed the message. At this stage, he opted to move out of Tharasu due to various conflicts.

Founder of Nakkheeran magazine
Rajagopal, with a sum of four thousand rupees, decided to start his own political investigative weekly magazine in 1988. He loved the epic title Nakkheeran but it was possessed by a politician named K. Subbu. When approached, K. Subbu gave away the title that led to the evolution of Nakkheeran, the weekly Tamil magazine. The material suppliers offered fund for 4–10 weeks positively. The office was set up in a small room at Kilpauk on the banks of river Cooum. The first issue of Nakkheeran came out on 20 April 1988.

Achievements
The editor of Nakkheeran Rajagopal (widely identified as Nakkheeran Gopal) locked horns with the state government of Tamil Nadu in Supreme Court of India to receive a landmark judgement in favour of press independence on 7 October 1994. This judgement was unanimously appreciated by global media, details below.

As an act of bravery, Nakkheeran is the first ever magazine to interview and expose a portrait of South India’s forest brigand Veerappan. The editor and his team effectively acted as an emissary between Veerappan and state governments to carry out a successful mission in rescuing thespian Rajkumar that calmed down the insecure atmosphere prevailed between two states since abduction in 2000.  Earlier, Gopal had been successful in also rescuing eight forest guards kidnapped by Veerappan.

POTA
In 2003, he was arrested on charges of possession of an unlicensed revolver with ammunition.

After eight months of imprisonment, Gopal was ordered to be set free on bail by a division bench of the Madras High Court while allowing a habeas corpus petition filed by his brother. Emerging out of the prison, Gopal said his obtaining the bail was the 'first blow' to the "autocratic rule" of Tamil Nadu Chief Minister Jayalalithaa" This victory is Nakeeran's first step. Let the government file any number of false cases, we will emerge victorious," he said in brief remarks as he was given a rousing reception by magazine staff and others in front of the prison complex. The high court had faulted the police for not providing any reasons for his arrest under IPC and Pota. Gopal was first arrested in April 2003 in connection with the murder of a police informant, allegedly by forest brigand Veerappan, and was subsequently charged under Pota for alleged possession of arms.

Author
Nakkeeran Gopal penned a series called "Challenge" (late 1990s) and Yutham (late 2000s) in his own Nakkheeran magazine. Later, the consolidations were released as a book. "Challenge" describes the agony put forth by Jayalalithaa between 1991 and 1996 whereas his Yutham (elaborated in four parts) briefs how his team tackled the distress caused by 2001–06 TN Govt.

References

Interviews
 
 

Living people
Tamil-language writers
Indian male novelists
1959 births
Journalists from Tamil Nadu
Indian magazine editors
20th-century Indian journalists
Indian male journalists
Writers from Chennai
20th-century Indian male writers